The 2018–19 season was FC Banants's eighteenth consecutive season in the Armenian Premier League.

Season events
On 11 August 2018, Ilshat Fayzulin was appointed as Banants caretaker manager following the resignation of Artur Voskanyan.
On 5 September, Fayzulin was confirmed as the new permanent head coach of Banants.

Squad

Transfers

In

Loans in

Out

Released

Competitions

Armenian Premier League

Results

Table

Armenian Cup

UEFA Europa League

Qualifying rounds

Statistics

Appearances and goals

|-
|colspan="14"|Banants-2 Players:

|-
|colspan="14"|Players who left Banants during the season:

|}

Goal scorers

Clean sheets

Disciplinary Record

References

FC Urartu seasons
Banants
Banants